(born 1933, Fushun, China) is a Japanese environmental architect.

Kimura's main interests lie in sustainable architecture and engineering.  In 1972, he designed a solar-heated house for his family, which attracted public attention after the oil crisis of 1973.  Since then, he has designed several more solar houses and conducted studies on energy conservation in buildings, utilization of natural energy sources, and solar heating and cooling.  He has also enjoyed a long career in academia, and has authored a variety of publications.

Kimura is the father of Mari Kimura, a Japanese violinist and composer in New York.

Education and employment
Kimura studied architecture and building science at Waseda University in Tokyo, graduating in 1957 with a bachelor's degree in Architecture.  He stayed at the University to complete a master's degree in Science, graduating in 1959. Then he joined the Solar Energy Project, and, from 1960–62, he worked as a research assistant at the Massachusetts Institute of Technology (MIT) through the Fulbright Program, with Prof. Lawrence B. Anderson as his adviser.

After leaving MIT, he returned to Waseda University's Department of Architecture.  There he worked on some architectural research projects, and obtained a Doctorate in Engineering in 1965.

From 1967-69, Kimura worked as a post-doctoral fellow at the Canadian National Research Council's Division of Building Research in Ottawa, Ontario, Canada.  There he worked on developing the use of computers in environmental engineering, particularly in relation to regulating buildings' heating and cooling loads.

Kimura taught at Waseda University in various positions since 1964. From 1964-67, he was an Assistant Professor. In 1967, he graduated to the position of Associate Professor, and remained in that position for six years. He was made a full Professor in 1973 and taught in that capacity until 1999, when he retired as a Professor Emeritus. At that point, he left the Department of Architecture and became a Professor at Waseda's Advanced Research Institute for Science and Engineering.

Awards
 Research Paper Award, Society of Heating, Air-Conditioning and Sanitary Engineering of Japan, 1968, 1972, 1973
 Research Paper Award, Architectural Institute of Japan, 1982
 PLEA (Passive and Low Energy Architecture) Award, 1997
 Farrington Daniels Award, International Solar Energy Society, 1999

Membership in academic societies

Membership on Boards of Directors
 The Architectural Institute of Japan (1981–82)
 The International Relations Committee (1972–73, 1975–76, 1978, 1987-88)
 Served as Chairman from 1979–81 and 1992–94
 The American Society of Heating, Air-Conditioning and Refrigerating Engineers (1974-1980)
Served as Chairman of the organization's Japanese section from 1984-1987

Other leadership positions
 The Society of Heating, Air Conditioning and Sanitary Engineers of Japan
 Vice President, 1980–82; President, 1994–96
 The International Solar Energy Society
 Vice President, 1975–84; President, 1984–86
 The International Academy of Indoor Air Science
 Steering Committee member, 1988–91; member of the Directorate, 1990–93
 Honorary President of NPO Environmental House
 He also served as Treasurer from 1994–97

Participation in international conferences
Kimura has served as Chairman or Vice-Chairman of the Organizing Committees for various international conferences, including:
 International Symposium on Thermal Application of Solar Energy, 1985, Hakone, Japan (Vice-Chairman) 
 World Solar Energy Congress, 1989, Kobe, Japan (Chairman)
 7th International Conference on PLEA, 1989, Nara, Japan (Vice-Chairman)
 10th International Conference of PLEA, 1992, Auckland, New Zealand (Chairman)
 7th International Conference on Indoor Air Quality and Climate (INDOOR AIR 96), 1996, Nagoya, Japan (Chairman)

He has also been a member of the International Advisory Committee for many international conferences.

Design projects
Kimura has collaborated and consulted on a number of design projects, including:
 The Kimura Solar House (Tokorozawa, Saitama), 1972
 An Experimental Solar House for the Science and Technology Agency (Souka, Saitama), 1974
 Chiba Solar House (Kamakura, Kanazawa), 1976
 Sagara Solar House (Inagi, Tokyo), 1979
 Suzuki Solar House (Oyama, Tochigi), 1979
 Kusano Solar House (Yokohama, Kanazawa), 1981
 Miki Solar House (Setagaya, Tokyo), 1982
 Takasaki Clinic and Solar House (Nerima, Tokyo), 1983
 TEPCO Passive Solar House (Shinagawa, Tokyo), 1988
 Creatopia Collective Solar Houses (Obuse, Nagano), 1978
 Solar Building of the Department of Energy Engineering at Oita University by Sunshine Project, MITI (Oita City, Oita), 1975
 Hirakata Solar House by Sunshine Project, MITI (Hirakata, Osaka), 1975
 Japanese Advanced Solar House IV-NA21 (Nasu, Tochigi), 1994
 Building for the Faculty of Environmental Engineering, Kitakyushu University (Kitakyushu, Fukuoka), 1999

Publications
 Fundamental Theories of Building Services, Gakkensha, 1970
 Environmental Engineering (Building Technology Series No.2), Shoukokusha, 1976
 Scientific Basis of Air Conditioning, Applied Science Publishers, London, 1977
 Introduction to Solar Houses, Omusha, 1980
 Theories of Solar Energy (New Architectural Science Series No.8), Shoukokusha, 1984
 Space Cooling and Heating Load Calculation (Handbook of Air-Conditioning and Sanitary Engineering, 10th Edition, Chapter 2 of Volume 5), Society of Heating, Air-Conditioning and Sanitary Engineers of Japan, 1981
 Pocket Book of Architectural Glossary – Environment and Building Services, Maruzen, 1986 (editor)
 Theories of Architectural Environment, Vol. 1, Maruzen, 1991 (editor)
 Theories of Architectural Environment, Vol. 2, Maruzen, 1992 (editor, co-author)
 Natural Energy Technologies of Vernacular Architecture, 1999 (editor, co-author)
 Glossary of House Environment, Sokokusha, 2003
 Scientific Basis of Air Conditioning (Revised Version), Building Research Institute, Japan, 2010
 World Journey of Environmental Architecture, IRIHE, Japan, 2013
 Essay on Architectural Environment, IRIHE, Japan, 2013

References

1933 births
Living people
Japanese architects
Waseda University alumni
Academic staff of Waseda University